Lobel Island is an island nearly  long, laying  southwest of Brown Island in the Wauwermans Islands of the Wilhelm Archipelago, Antarctica. It was charted by the Third French Antarctic Expedition under Jean-Baptiste Charcot, 1903–05, and named for Loicq de Lobel.

See also 
 List of Antarctic and sub-Antarctic islands

References

Islands of the Wilhelm Archipelago